1985 Indian Ocean Games in Mauritius

Played in Mauritius.

Group stage

Group A

27 August 1985

28 August 1985

29 August 1985

Group B

27 August 1985

29 August 1985

30 August 1985

Knockout stage

Third place match
31 August 1985

1 The match was scratched and Comoros were awarded third place as Madagascar failed to appear at the stadium for the match.

Final
31 August 1985

See also
Indian Ocean Island Games
Football at the Indian Ocean Island Games

References
rsssf.com 

1985
Indian Ocean Games 1985